The Washington Elementary School District provides education for more than 25,300 students in the north central Phoenix and east Glendale areas of Arizona. With 32 schools, WESD is the largest elementary school district in Arizona.

Gifted Services are offered at all schools, with approximately 1,660 students being challenged beyond the traditional classroom setting, including two self-contained programs that serve highly gifted students. Title I services, which offer supplemental education for identified students in need of additional assistance, are provided at 20 schools.

The district's attendance rate matches the state average at 95 percent. WESD's per-pupil spending is $6,554, compared to the Arizona average of $6,556.

WESD's Superintendent is Dr. Paul Stanton. The five-member governing board includes president Kate McGee, vice president Bev Kraft, and members Bill Adams, Tee Lambert, and Chris Maza. 
The district's office is located at 4650 W. Sweetwater, Glendale, Arizona, 85304.

K-6 schools 
 Acacia Elementary
 Alta Vista Elementary
 Arroyo Elementary
 Cactus Wren Elementary
 Chaparral Elementary
 Desert View Elementary
 Ironwood Elementary
 John Jacobs Elementary
 Lookout Mountain Elementary
 Manzanita Elementary
 Moon Mountain Elementary
 Ocotillo Elementary
 Richard E. Miller Elementary
 Roadrunner Elementary
 Sahuaro Elementary
 Shaw Butte Elementary
 Sunburst Elementary
 Sunset Elementary
 Tumbleweed Elementary
 Washington Elementary

Middle schools 
 Cholla Middle School - grades 7-8
 Desert Foothills Junior High
 Mountain Sky Junior High
 Palo Verde Middle School
 Royal Palm Middle School

K-7/K-8 schools 
 Abraham Lincoln Traditional
 Maryland Elementary
 Orangewood Elementary
 Sunnyslope Elementary 
 Sweetwater School
 Mountain View Elementary

External links 
 Washington Elementary School District website
 Arizona Department of Education district report card for 2006-2007
 greatschools district profile

School districts in Phoenix, Arizona
Education in Glendale, Arizona
School districts in Maricopa County, Arizona